Laurent Pierre Bonadéi (born on 3 November 1969), is a French football coach who is the assistant coach of the Saudi Arabia national team, under Hervé Renard, having previously coached the team during the 2021 FIFA Arab Cup.

Bonadéi was the coach of youth club teams such as Paris Saint-Germain U19, and Nice II.

References

1969 births
Living people
French football managers
Saudi Arabia national football team managers
French expatriate football managers
French expatriate sportspeople in Saudi Arabia
Expatriate football managers in Saudi Arabia